Stay Hungry is the third studio album by American heavy metal band Twisted Sister. Released on May 10, 1984, the album includes the band's two most well-known songs, "We're Not Gonna Take It" and "I Wanna Rock". According to RIAA certification, Stay Hungry is the band's most successful album by far and the only certified platinum. Eventually the album gained multi-platinum status with U.S. sales of more than 3,000,000 copies by 1995.

During recording, producer Tom Werman brought some songs by NWOBHM band Saxon for the band to listen to, this led to a conflict with Dee Snider who understood it as Werman wanting the band to replace some of his songs with Saxon covers. Guitarist Jay Jay French also claims the band lost two songs that they wanted on the album due to Werman's influence

 Twisted Sister performed the song "Burn in Hell" during a cameo appearance in the 1985 film Pee-wee's Big Adventure. The song "Burn in Hell" was covered by black metal band Dimmu Borgir on Puritanical Euphoric Misanthropia. "We're Not Gonna Take It" was also covered by Bif Naked on the Ready to Rumble soundtrack. The two songs that comprise the Horror-Teria segment became the basis of Twisted Sister lead singer Dee Snider's 1998 film Strangeland, in which Captain Howdy was played by Snider himself. The "Captain Howdy" segment of the "Horror-Teria" suite would later be covered by the death metal group Broken Hope on their album Repulsive Conception and in 1999 by the Swedish heavy metal band Morgana Lefay on their Symphony of the Damned, Re-symphonised album.

In 2004, the band re-recorded all nine songs from this album and re-released them under the title Still Hungry.

In 2009, the band played Stay Hungry in its entirety for the first time including songs never played live before, such as "Don't Let Me Down" and "Horror-Teria: Street Justice".

Reception
Metal Rules ranked the album #5 on their list of the Top 50 Glam Metal Albums.

In 2016, Loudwire ranked the album at number 6 on their list of the Top 30 Hair Metal Albums.

In 2017, Rolling Stone listed the album at No. 76 on its list of the 100 Greatest Metal Albums of All Time.

Track listing
All songs are written by Dee Snider.

Deluxe edition
A 25th Anniversary Edition was released on June 30, 2009 by Rhino Records. The first disc contains remastered versions of the nine tracks from the May 1984 original. The bonus disc uncovers 15 unreleased outtakes and early demos from the original sessions, recorded in December 1983 at Nino's Studios, Baldwin, New York, as well as the new track "30" recorded especially for this collection by the 1984 lineup at Audio Magic, West Babylon, New York.

Additionally, any music fan who bought the CD or vinyl of Stay Hungry 25th Anniversary Edition in any participating independent record store received a free gift from the band: a DVD of the Twisted Sister 1984 Uncut Live at San Bernardino concert. Originally broadcast on MTV as Stay Hungry Live, the concert had been commercially unavailable for years and previously unavailable as DVD. June 30, 2009 was the only day the DVD was available and only through participating, independent record stores with a limited stock.

Commented guitarist Jay Jay French, "While other bands have made exclusive deals with big box chains and discounters, Twisted Sister remembers all the independent record shops who have supported us through the years."

Bonus disc
 "Death from Above" – 2:42
 "Prime Motivator" – 2:25
 "We’re Not Gonna Take It" – 2:47 (early demo) 
 "Death Run" – 1:45 
 "This One’s for You" – 2:00
 "S.M.F." – 2:14 (early demo)
 "We’re Coming On" – 1:42
 "Call My Name" – 2:10 
 "Burn in Hell" – 5:08 (early demo)
 "Pay the Price" – 1:42
 "What’s Love Without You" – 1:44
 "Our Voice Will Be Heard" – 1:29
 "You Got to Fight" – 1:39
 "The Price" – 2:36 (early demo)
 "Stay Hungry" – 1:58 (early demo)
 "KMET Radio Spot" – 0:24
 "30" – 4:23 (new track)
 "Lollipop Guild" – 0:30 (hidden track)

Personnel

Twisted Sister
Dee Snider - lead vocals
Eddie "Fingers" Ojeda - lead guitar, backing vocals
Jay Jay French - rhythm guitar, lead guitar on "Stay Hungry", "S.M.F." co lead guitar on "Burn In Hell", "Don't Let Me Down", backing vocals
Mark "The Animal" Mendoza - bass, backing vocals
A. J. Pero - drums, percussion

Additional musicians
Dean Werman, Gabby McGachan, Neidermeyer - sound effects, handclapping

Production
Tom Werman - producer, arrangements with Twisted Sister
Geoff Workman - engineer, mixing
Gary McGachan - additional engineer at Cherokee Studios
John "Red" Agnello - additional engineer at Record Plant
Greg Laney - additional engineer at Westlake Studio
George Marino - mastering at Sterling Sound, New York
Bob Defrin - art direction

Charts

Album

Singles

Certifications

References

Twisted Sister albums
1984 albums
Atlantic Records albums
Albums produced by Tom Werman